Premier Manager: Ninety Nine – Total Football Management is a soccer management simulation game, for PC, PlayStation and Nintendo 64 (with the N64 version known as Premier Manager 64). It was released only in Europe in 1999 and was developed by Dinamic Multimedia and published by Gremlin Interactive. It is part of the Premier Manager series and is endorsed by Kevin Keegan.

Overview
Premier Manager: Ninety Nine is a football management simulation game that puts the player in charge of a team of their choice from the top four English divisions (Premier League to the third division, as it was known at the time) or the top two Italian leagues (Serie A and Serie B) on the PlayStation version, but limited to just the English leagues in the PC and N64 releases. The player must manage the team's tactics, formations and training. The player must also manage the financial side of running a football club so to be able to afford to purchase new players for the team.

Premier Manager uses the Actua Soccer engine to display football matches. At the time this was a new feature and set Premier Manager apart from other football management games. Using the engine allows the player of the game to view the match in great detail and assess where tactical changes need to be made. The game featured commentary from Barry Davies.

Development
Madrid-based Dinamic Multimedia had already worked on several titles in the genre, having developed and published the PC Fútbol series from 1992 and developed the Premier Manager series for Gremlin Interactive since the '97 release.

Reception 
Steve Key of CVG gave the PlayStation version a score of 5/5, praising the breadth of the gameplay compared to Championship Manager 3, describing the ability to "pick sponsors for hoardings around the pitch, TV rights, upgrade the stadium [and] fluctuate ticket prices" alongside the traditional management options as "almost player-chairman simulation".

References

1999 video games
Association football management video games
Dinamic Multimedia games
Europe-exclusive video games
Gremlin Interactive games
Nintendo 64 games
PlayStation (console) games
Single-player video games
Video games developed in the United Kingdom
Windows games